Bo Wirhed (born 11 November 1935) is a Swedish gymnast. He competed in eight events at the 1960 Summer Olympics.

References

1935 births
Living people
Swedish male artistic gymnasts
Olympic gymnasts of Sweden
Gymnasts at the 1960 Summer Olympics
People from Hedemora